The United States Youth Soccer Association (US Youth Soccer) is the largest youth affiliate and member of U.S. Soccer, the governing body for soccer in the United States. US Youth Soccer includes 54 State Associations, one per state except for California, New York, Pennsylvania and Texas, which each have two State Associations.

US Youth Soccer is a non-profit organization.

The US Youth Soccer membership is divided into four geographic regions; Eastern, Midwest, Southern and Far West.

References 

Soccer governing bodies in the United States
Youth soccer in the United States
Youth soccer leagues in the United States